Broad Run Reservoir, or Fourth Hollow Reservoir, is a reservoir located in the Broad Mountain within the Borough of Nesquehoning, Pennsylvania. It was built between 1970-1971.

It provides drinking water for the Borough of Nesquehoning.

Water released from the reservoir flows into the Nesquehoning Creek.

See also 
Nesquehoning Creek

External links
Aerial View using Microsoft Virtual Earth

Reservoirs in Pennsylvania
Protected areas of Carbon County, Pennsylvania
Bodies of water of Carbon County, Pennsylvania